In New Zealand, the Crown Entities Act 2004 is a statute which provides the framework for the establishment, governance, and operation of Crown entities; and to clarify accountability relationships between Crown entities, their board members, their responsible Ministers on behalf of the Crown, and the House of Representatives.

External links
Text of the Act

Statutes of New Zealand
2004 in New Zealand law